Fernando Coto Albán (October 30, 1919 – September 28, 1989) was a Costa Rican jurist. He succeeded Fernando Baudrit Solera as President of the Supreme Court of Justice of Costa Rica and held the position from 1975 to 1983.

He was born in Cartago, Costa Rica, October 30th 1919. His parents were Manuel Coto Arias and Ernestina Albán Cordero. He married Virginia Martén Pagés.

1919 births
1989 deaths
People from Cartago Province
20th-century Costa Rican judges
Supreme Court of Justice of Costa Rica judges